Jazz Waltz is an album by pianist Les McCann with the Jazz Crusaders recorded in 1963 and released on the Pacific Jazz label.

Reception

Allmusic gives the album 3 stars.

Track listing 
All compositions by Les McCann except where noted.
 "Spanish Castles" (George Gruntz) - 2:24
 "Blues for Yna Yna" (Gerald Wilson) - 3:08
 "Damascus" - 4:09
 "3/4 For God & Co." - 3:24
 "Bluesette" (Toots Thielemans) - 2:58
 "Big City" (Marvin Jenkins) - 2:35
 "This Here" (Bobby Timmons) - 2:59
 "Jitterbug Waltz" (Fats Waller) - 3:42
 "All Blues" (Miles Davis) - 4:12
 "Jazz Waltz" (Bobby Haynes) - 2:45

Personnel 
Les McCann - piano, organ, electric piano
The Jazz Crusaders
Wayne Henderson - trombone
Wilton Felder - tenor saxophone
Joe Sample - piano, organ
Bobby Haynes - bass
Stix Hooper - drums

References 

Les McCann albums
The Jazz Crusaders albums
1963 albums
Pacific Jazz Records albums
Collaborative albums